Tlia is a village in the Java District of South Ossetia or Shida Kartli, Georgia. The village is located in the Vaneli Community on the right bank of Tlidoni river, at an altitude of 1,800 m. Distance to the municipality center Java is 23 km.

Notable people 
 Lado Ketskhoveli (1877–1903) - writer and revolutionary

Notes

References 

Populated places in Dzau District